New Hartford is a city in Butler County, Iowa, United States. The population was 570 at the time of the 2020 census.

Geography
New Hartford's longitude and latitude coordinates in decimal form are 42.567189, -92.621435.

Demographics

2010 census
At the 2010 census, there were 516 people, 215 households and 147 families living in the city. The racial makeup of the city was 98.1% White, 0.4% Native American, 0.2% Asian, 0.4% from other races, and 1.0% from two or more races. Hispanic or Latino of any race were 1.6% of the population.

There were 215 households, of which 30.7% had children under the age of 18 living with them, 53.5% were married couples living together, 10.7% had a female householder with no husband present, 4.2% had a male householder with no wife present, and 31.6% were non-families. 26.5% of all households were made up of individuals, and 9.8% had someone living alone who was 65 years of age or older. The average household size was 2.40 and the average family size was 2.83.

The median age was 38.3 years. 25% of residents were under the age of 18; 5.7% were between the ages of 18 and 24; 27.8% were from 25 to 44; 28.6% were from 45 to 64; and 13% were 65 years of age or older. The population was 51.0% male and 49.0% female.

2000 census
At the 2000 census,  there were 659 people, 270 households and 196 families living in the city. The racial makeup of the city was 98.63% White, 0.15% Native American, 0.15% Asian, 0.15% from other races, and 0.91% from two or more races. Hispanic or Latino of any race were 1.06% of the population.

There were 270 households, of which 30.7% had children under the age of 18 living with them, 58.5% were married couples living together, 8.5% had a female householder with no husband present, and 27.4% were non-families. 22.6% of all households were made up of individuals, and 10.7% had someone living alone who was 65 years of age or older. The average household size was 2.44 and the average family size was 2.87.

23.5% of the population were under the age of 18, 9.0% from 18 to 24, 26.3% from 25 to 44, 27.6% from 45 to 64, and 13.7% who were 65 years of age or older. The median age was 38 years. For every 100 females, there were 92.7 males. For every 100 females age 18 and over, there were 94.6 males.

The median household income was $34,750 and the median family income was $38,816. Males had a median income of $30,909 and females $19,485. The per capita income was $16,771. About 8.2% of families and 9.0% of the population were below the poverty line, including 17.1% of those under age 18 and none of those age 65 or over.

Education
Dike–New Hartford Community School District is the local school district. It was established on July 1, 1996, by the merger of the Dike and New Hartford school districts.

2008 tornado and flood

New Hartford was struck by a confirmed EF5 tornado on May 25, 2008. Two people were killed as well as seven people in nearby Parkersburg. This is the second confirmed EF5 tornado since the Enhanced Fujita scale was introduced, the other occurring in Greensburg, Kansas, on May 4, 2007. The town was prone to flooding until a levee was built around the town, which was raised and reinforced in 2009.  In June 2008, only one week after being struck by a record EF5 tornado, the town experienced record flooding that forced all residents to evacuate. The flood damaged many homes and buildings in the town then incited relief efforts from FEMA and the American Red Cross. The Red Cross provided food assistance in the town, distributing grocery items at the town's community building and fire station, as well as providing meals out of a food truck. Some affected residents temporarily lived in FEMA trailers. Many residents made efforts to repair their homes, while others relocated outside of the town.

Notable person
New Hartford is the hometown and birthplace of U.S. Senator and former President pro tempore Chuck Grassley of Iowa.

References

External links

City of New Hartford, Iowa Portal style website, Government, Business, and more
City-Data Comprehensive Statistical Data and more about New Hartford

Cities in Butler County, Iowa
Cities in Iowa